Ithycythara parkeri is a species of sea snail, a marine gastropod mollusk in the family Mangeliidae.

Description
The length of the shell attains 6 mm.

Distribution
I. parkeri can be found in the Atlantic Ocean, the Gulf of Mexico and Caribbean waters, ranging from the coast of North Carolina south to Colombia and surrounding Puerto Rico. at depths between 1 m and 55 m.

References

 Abbott, R. T. 1958. The marine mollusks of Grand Cayman Island, British West Indies. Monographs of the Academy of Natural Sciences of Philadelphia 11: [viii] + 138 pp., 5 pls.
 Rosenberg, G., F. Moretzsohn, and E. F. García. 2009. Gastropoda (Mollusca) of the Gulf of Mexico, Pp. 579–699 in Felder, D.L. and D.K. Camp (eds.), Gulf of Mexico–Origins, Waters, and Biota. Biodiversity. Texas A&M Press, College Station, Texas

External links
  Tucker, J.K. 2004 Catalog of recent and fossil turrids (Mollusca: Gastropoda). Zootaxa 682:1–1295.
 
 MNHN, Paris : Ithycythara parkeri

parkeri
Gastropods described in 1958